Peka Bridge is a border post located between South Africa and Lesotho.

References

Lesotho–South Africa border crossings